Microcara is a genus of marsh beetles in the family Scirtidae. There are about 10 described species in Microcara.

Species
These 10 species belong to the genus Microcara:
 Microcara dispar Seidlitz, 1872
 Microcara dufaui Legros, 1947
 Microcara explanata (LeConte, 1866)
 Microcara omissa Klausnitzer, 1972
 Microcara pilosula Reitter, 1911
 Microcara testacea (Linnaeus, 1767)
 † Microcara dokhturovi Yablokov-Khnzorian, 1960
 † Microcara kusnezovi Yablokov-Khnzorian, 1960
 † Microcara znojkoi Yablokov-Khnzorian, 1960
 † Microcara zubkovi Yablokov-Khnzorian, 1960

References

Further reading

External links

 

Scirtoidea
Articles created by Qbugbot